Hirt's Gardens is a retail greenhouse located in Granger Township, Medina County, Ohio that sells seeds, seedlings, and mature plants.

Notable Media Coverage
Although Hirt's Gardens started as a small family business and is managed today by Matthew Hirt, the great-grandson of founder Sam Hirt, it has received national coverage. Its significance has been established in multiple ways. The Hirt family's greenhouses have been mentioned in historical society books such as Strongsville: We Shape Our Destiny, 1968. The architecture of the greenhouses was highlighted in the book Images of America: Strongsville written by Bruce M. Courey. Hirt's Gardens is listed as a resource on Ohio State University's Horticulture and Crop Science Resource page. The Hirt family's four generations who have run the business have been featured in newspaper articles such as reporter Linda Kinsey's article, "Family Roots Traced to Local Greenhouse". Alan Hirt's wide-ranging success (radio, florist shops in malls) was covered in Kimberly Harrison's article "Hirt Tunes in Fewer Plant Shops, More Radio". National garden writers, such as Brenda Beust Smith from the Houston Chronicle, have cited Hirt's Gardens in their columns  Mother Earth News,a popular magazine about gardening, listed Hirt's as one of the top 20 sources for heirloom tomato seeds in the United States.

History
Hirt's Gardens is a family business that has operated continuously since 1915 and is one of the oldest retail greenhouses in Ohio. Started by Sam and Anna Hirt, its early focus was on horseradish and vegetables, which Sam Hirt sold in Cleveland. It is believed that Sam intended to pass the business directly to his eldest son, Paul Hirt, but Paul Hirt died in 1918 when the merchant marine ship he was on, the Otranto, sank off the coast of England. So Sam Hirt passed the business to some of his other sons, most notably Lawrence Hirt, Arthur Hirt, and Hobart Hirt. Lawrence and Arthur started Hirt's Wholesale, which supplied florists supplies, vegetable seedlings, and houseplants to the retail business run by Hobart and his wife, Onalee (née Baker). The retail business was initially called Strongsville Greenhouse and was located at 13867 Pearl Rd, Strongsville, Ohio.

The three children of Hobart and Onalee Hirt were Marie, Clare, and Alan. All worked at the greenhouse in the 1960s and 1970s, and the business was passed on to Clare and Alan in the mid-1970s, who were joined by a third business partner, Paul King, whom they had met at Ohio State University. By then, the greenhouses were known as Hirt's Greenhouse and Flowers. For a while, they operated small florists’ outlets at two popular northeast Ohio malls, Great Northern Mall and Beachwood Place. Alan Hirt (along with his wife at the time, Karen Hirt) found great success appearing on local news and radio shows, where they answered common gardening questions. By the late 1990s, the successful business included a floral shop and 14 greenhouses wall-to-wall at the intersections of Pearl Road and Royalton Road, one of the busiest corners in Strongsville.

In 2004, the property was sold to developers, but the business did not end. Clare Hirt took over the floral part of the business, called it Hirt's Flowers, and re-located down the road from the original business at 14407 Pearl Rd. Hirt's Flowers was then sold in 2014, and while it retains the Hirt name, it is no longer run by the Hirt family. Alan Hirt and his son, Matthew Hirt, took over the horticulture part of the business, now called Hirt's Gardens. It is now located at 4943 Ridge Rd. The original Strongsville greenhouses were demolished in 2005.

References

External links
 Hirt's Gardens Retail Web Site
 Hirt's Facebook Page
 Photographs of the Hirt Family and Their Greenhouses
 Article about Increasing Popularity of Growing Vegetables Featuring an Interview with Alan Hirt
 Article about Hirt's Gardens Sensitive Plants Appearing on CSI: New York
 Link to Images of America: Strongsville, featuring Hirt's Gardens
 Link to Hirt's Gardens appearance on Ohio State University's Horticulture and Crop Sciences Resource Page

Medina County, Ohio
Buildings and structures in Medina County, Ohio
Strongsville, Ohio